Sawyer is a town in Choctaw County, Oklahoma, United States. The population was 321 at the 2010 census.

History 
Sawyer was located in Kiamitia County, one of the constituent counties comprising the Apukshunnubbee District of the Choctaw Nation. On November 4, 2022, a violent EF4 tornado passed just east of Sawyer.

Geography
Sawyer is located in eastern Choctaw County at  (34.012880, -95.372138). The town center is on the east side of the Kiamichi River at Hugo Dam. The town limits extend north up the east side of Hugo Lake and west to touch the southwest side of the lake.

U.S. Route 70 passes through the town, leading west  to the city of Hugo, the Choctaw County seat, and east  to Fort Towson.

Demographics

As of the census of 2000, there were 274 people, 115 households, and 80 families residing in the town. There were 127 housing units at an average density of 27.4 per square mile (10.6/km2). The racial makeup of the town was 76.28% White, 0.36% African American, 17.15% Native American, 0.73% from other races, and 5.47% from two or more races. Hispanic or Latino of any race were 1.46% of the population.

There were 115 households, out of which 27.0% had children under the age of 18 living with them, 61.7% were married couples living together, 6.1% had a female householder with no husband present, and 29.6% were non-families. 25.2% of all households were made up of individuals, and 7.8% had someone living alone who was 65 years of age or older. The average household size was 2.38 and the average family size was 2.89.

In the town, the population was spread out, with 24.8% under the age of 18, 5.1% from 18 to 24, 29.6% from 25 to 44, 27.4% from 45 to 64, and 13.1% who were 65 years of age or older. The median age was 39 years. For every 100 females, there were 97.1 males. For every 100 females age 18 and over, there were 100.0 males.

The median income for a household in the town was $24,375, and the median income for a family was $29,688. Males had a median income of $26,071 versus $19,375 for females. The per capita income for the town was $11,874. About 16.0% of families and 24.9% of the population were below the poverty line, including 24.7% of those under the age of eighteen and 60.9% of those 65 or over.

References

Towns in Choctaw County, Oklahoma
Towns in Oklahoma